Tak Jung-im (born 4 March 1967) is a South Korean fencer.

Career
Tak competed in the women's individual and team foil events at the 1988 Summer Olympics. She went on to win a gold medal in the individual foil event at the 1990 Asian Games.

Personal life
Tak grew up in Busan, where she took up fencing as a first-year student at Namdo Girls' Middle School (南都여중). She continued in the sport after she went on to Yeongdo Girls' High School (영도여고), and was chosen for the South Korean national team in her second year of high school. Soon after the 1990 Asian Games, she retired from sport and married fellow fencer Hong Yeong-Seung, one of several marriages between fencing team members around that time.

References

1967 births
Living people
South Korean female foil fencers
Olympic fencers of South Korea
Fencers at the 1988 Summer Olympics
Sportspeople from Busan
Asian Games medalists in fencing
Fencers at the 1986 Asian Games
Fencers at the 1990 Asian Games
Asian Games gold medalists for South Korea
Asian Games silver medalists for South Korea
Medalists at the 1986 Asian Games
Medalists at the 1990 Asian Games